Carlo Bergamini may refer to:

 Carlo Bergamini (admiral) (1888–1943), World War II Italian admiral killed aboard the battleship Roma
 Carlo Bergamini (sculptor) (1868–1934), Italian sculptor and monumental mason